Dean Bombač (born 4 April 1989) is a Slovenian handball player for SC Pick Szeged and the Slovenian national team.

References

External links

1989 births
Living people
Sportspeople from Koper
Slovenian male handball players
Expatriate handball players
Expatriate handball players in Poland
Slovenian expatriate sportspeople in Belarus
Slovenian expatriate sportspeople in France
Slovenian expatriate sportspeople in Hungary
Slovenian expatriate sportspeople in Poland
Vive Kielce players
SC Pick Szeged players
Olympic handball players of Slovenia
Handball players at the 2016 Summer Olympics